QIP (an acronym for Quiet Internet Pager) is a multiprotocol instant messaging client. It is a closed source freeware program originally developed by Ilgam Zyulkorneev. In 2008 it was bought by RosBusinessConsulting media group and named most popular RBC service in 2009.

Features 

A Softpedia review of QIP 2006 mentioned its unique feature (at the time) of tabbed message windows—instead of a message window for each chat session, one window with several tabs is shown.  Since this feature's introduction, ICQ Version 6.0 now includes this feature, as do the multi-service clients Pidgin, Miranda NG, and Trillian.  Other features include integrated mail.ru e-mail client, and a wider range of emoticons. QIP presents no advertisements in the application windows; this is described as a security advantage.

Versions

QIP 2005 
QIP 2005 is an alternative instant messaging client based on the OSCAR protocol. It has full support of ICQ and experimental support of AIM.

QIP 2005 does not properly support Unicode which causes issues when sending and receiving non-ASCII messages unless both users use QIP.

QIP Infium 
QIP Infium is the second version of QIP. It features full Unicode support and is multi-protocol client, supporting the following protocols:
 OSCAR: ICQ
 XMPP, first stolen  and only then licensed on Miranda NG Jabber Plug-in with preinstalled settings for QIP, LiveJournal, Google Talk
 XIMSS (CommuniGate Pro IM and VoIP protocol) with preinstalled  settings for QIP, SIPNET and Euroset
 Mail.ru Agent
 IRC (Additional plugin)

QIP 2010 

New version of QIP named QIP 2010 contains all features of Infium and interface of QIP 2005.

QIP 2012 

QIP Infium will attempt to reset Internet Explorer to use the search engine at the QIP homepage (currently written in Russian).
This feature can be disabled on the first attempt or by using the Add-on Manager under the Tools menu of Internet Explorer.

QIP PDA 

QIP PDA is a mobile version of QIP made for Windows Mobile, Symbian OS S60, and Symbian OS UIQ 3.

See also 

 Comparison of instant messaging clients
 Online chat

References

External links 

  

AIM (software) clients
Windows-only freeware
Windows-only instant messaging clients
Internet Relay Chat clients
Windows Internet Relay Chat clients
Portable software
Symbian instant messaging clients